Hendrik Otto "Henk" Westbroek (born 27 February 1952) is a Dutch radiohost, singer, songwriter and former owner of a café named 'Stairway to Heaven' in the city of Utrecht. He was also a political activist for Leefbaar Utrecht and Leefbaar Nederland in 1998.

Music career

Westbroek was born in the former municipality of Zuilen, and studied sociology at Utrecht University, completing his course in 1973. In 1978, Westbroek, together with "the other Henk" (Henk Temming), formed the band Het Goede Doel. He scored several top ten hits with Temming and Het Goede Doel became one of the most successful Dutch language bands of the 1980s. In 1991, Het Goede Doel stopped performing. They had a brief reunion in 2001 and reunited again in 2008, producing a new record, Gekkenwerk.

Since 1991, Henk Westbroek has been performing solo with his band "Henk Westbroek & Consorten." As a solo artist he has met with success and his single "Zelfs je naam is mooi" spent 42 weeks in the Dutch chart Mega Top 100.

Radio career
In 1981 he started as a radio host. With Vara's Vuurwerk (Vara's Fireworks, with Vara being the name of the broadcoaster) he hosted the first programm with only hard rock music on Dutch public radio in the 80's. His show Denk aan Henk ("Think about Henk") on Dutch radio station 3FM ran four days a week from 1991 to 2003. He resumed the program, renamed Denk als Henk & Friends ("Think like Henk & Friends") at Yorin FM, from August 2004 to March 2006. Since 2006 he has a daily webradio show on KXRadio, an internet radio station founded by Rob Stenders.

Politics

References

External links

1952 births
Living people
Dutch singer-songwriters
Dutch republicans
Dutch political party founders
Livable Netherlands politicians
Municipal councillors of Utrecht (city)
People from Utrecht (city)